Thamer Nayef al-Hathal (born 1973) is, as of 2004, the mayor of the town of Nukhayb, Al Anbar Province, Iraq. Thamer is a business graduate of Baghdad University, and nephew of tribal chief Sheik Meta'ab al-Hathal (born 1937), who was picked up and released in a mass arrest by US forces in late 2003. Thamer was away at the time and was not arrested.

References

Al Anbar Governorate
Mayors of places in Iraq
Living people
University of Baghdad alumni
1973 births